Three Silent Men is a 1940 British crime film directed by Thomas Bentley and starring Sebastian Shaw, Derrick De Marney, Patricia Roc and Arthur Hambling. The screenplay concerns a pacifist surgeon who must operate to save the life of the inventor of a deadly weapon of war. When the inventor dies the surgeon becomes prime suspect.

Plot
Pacifist surgeon Sir James Quentin (Sebastian Shaw) operates on Zaroff (Meinhart Maur), the inventor of a lethal weapon to be used against the Allies in the war. When Zaroff is discovered dead from an excess of ether, Quentin is immediately suspected. To clear her father's name, Quentin's daughter Pat (Patricia Roc), and her boyfriend Captain Mellish (Derrick De Marney), search for the real murderer.

Cast
 Sebastian Shaw as Sir James Quentin
 Derrick De Marney as Captain John Mellish
 Patricia Roc as Pat Quentin
 Arthur Hambling as Ginger Brown
 Meinhart Maur as Karl Zaroff
 John Turnbull as Inspector Gill
 Peter Gawthorne as General Bullington
 André Morell as Klein
 Charles Oliver as Johnson
 Jack Vyvian as Sergeant Wells
 Billy Watts as Fernald
 Charles Paton as  Mr. Gibbs
 Basil Cunard as Dr. Fairlie
 Hugh Dempster as Nelson
 Ian Fleming as Pennington
 Cameron Hall as Badger Wood
 Scott Harrold as Ted Blacklock
 F.B.J. Sharp as Coroner
 Bill Shine as Bystander at accident
 Cynthia Stock as Matron

Critical reception
TV Guide gave the film two out of five stars, calling it, "Badly written, though the suspense makes it entertaining."

References

External links

1940 films
1940 crime films
British crime films
1940s English-language films
Films directed by Thomas Bentley
Films based on British novels
British black-and-white films
1940s British films